A non-standard cosmology is any physical cosmological model of the universe that was, or still is, proposed as an alternative to the then-current standard model of cosmology. The term non-standard is applied to any theory that does not conform to the scientific consensus. Because the term depends on the prevailing consensus, the meaning of the term changes over time. For example, hot dark matter would not have been considered non-standard in 1990, but would be in 2010. Conversely, a non-zero cosmological constant resulting in an accelerating universe would have been considered non-standard in 1990, but is part of the standard cosmology in 2010.

Several major cosmological disputes have occurred throughout the history of cosmology. One of the earliest was the Copernican Revolution, which established the heliocentric model of the Solar System. More recent was the Great Debate of 1920, in the aftermath of which the Milky Way's status as but one of the Universe's many galaxies was established. From the 1940s to the 1960s, the astrophysical community was equally divided between supporters of the Big Bang theory and supporters of a rival steady state universe; this is currently decided in favour of the Big Bang theory by advances in observational cosmology in the late 1960s. Nevertheless, there remained vocal detractors of the Big Bang theory including Fred Hoyle, Jayant Narlikar, Halton Arp, and Hannes Alfvén, whose cosmologies were relegated to the fringes of astronomical research. The few Big Bang opponents still active today often ignore well-established evidence from newer research, and as a consequence, today non-standard cosmologies that reject the Big Bang entirely are rarely published in peer-reviewed science journals but appear online in marginal journals and private websites.

The current standard model of cosmology is the Lambda-CDM model, wherein the Universe is governed by general relativity, began with a Big Bang and today is a nearly-flat universe that consists of approximately 5% baryons, 27% cold dark matter, and 68% dark energy. Lambda-CDM has been a successful model, but recent observational evidence seem to indicate significant tensions in Lambda-CDM, such as the Hubble tension, the KBC void, the dwarf galaxy problem, et cetera. Research on extensions or modifications to Lambda-CDM, as well as fundamentally different models, is ongoing. Topics investigated include quintessence, Modified Newtonian Dynamics (MOND) and its relativistic generalization TeVeS, and warm dark matter.

History
Modern physical cosmology as it is currently studied first emerged as a scientific discipline in the period after the Shapley–Curtis debate and discoveries by Edwin Hubble of a cosmic distance ladder when astronomers and physicists had to come to terms with a universe that was of a much larger scale than the previously assumed galactic size. Theorists who successfully developed cosmologies applicable to the larger-scale universe are remembered today as the founders of modern cosmology. Among these scientists are Arthur Milne, Willem de Sitter, Alexander Friedman, Georges Lemaître, and Albert Einstein himself.

After confirmation of the Hubble's law by observation, the two most popular cosmological theories became the Steady State theory of Hoyle, Gold and Bondi, and the big bang theory of Ralph Alpher, George Gamow, and Robert Dicke with a small number of supporters of a smattering of alternatives. One of the major successes of the Big Bang theory compared to its competitor was its prediction for the abundance of light elements in the universe that corresponds with the observed abundances of light elements. Alternative theories do not have a means to explain these abundances.

Theories which assert that the universe has an infinite age with no beginning have trouble accounting for the abundance of deuterium in the cosmos, because deuterium easily undergoes nuclear fusion in stars and there are no known astrophysical processes other than the Big Bang itself that can produce it in large quantities. Hence the fact that deuterium is not an extremely rare component of the universe suggests both that the universe has a finite age and that there was a process that created deuterium in the past that no longer occurs.

Theories which assert that the universe has a finite life, but that the Big Bang did not happen, have problems with the abundance of helium-4. The observed amount of 4He is far larger than the amount that should have been created via stars or any other known process. By contrast, the abundance of 4He in Big Bang models is very insensitive to assumptions about baryon density, changing only a few percent as the baryon density changes by several orders of magnitude. The observed value of 4He is within the range calculated.

Still, it was not until the discovery of the Cosmic microwave background radiation (CMB) by Arno Penzias and Robert Wilson in 1965, that most cosmologists finally concluded that observations were best explained by the big bang model. Steady State theorists and other non-standard cosmologies were then tasked with providing an explanation for the phenomenon if they were to remain plausible. This led to original approaches including integrated starlight and cosmic iron whiskers, which were meant to provide a source for a pervasive, all-sky microwave background that was not due to an early universe phase transition.

Scepticism about the non-standard cosmologies' ability to explain the CMB caused interest in the subject to wane since then, however, there have been two periods in which interest in non-standard cosmology has increased due to observational data which posed difficulties for the big bang. The first occurred was the late 1970s when there were a number of unsolved problems, such as the horizon problem, the flatness problem, and the lack of magnetic monopoles, which challenged the big bang model. These issues were eventually resolved by cosmic inflation in the 1980s. This idea subsequently became part of the understanding of the big bang, although alternatives have been proposed from time to time. The second occurred in the mid-1990s when observations of the ages of globular clusters and the primordial helium abundance, apparently disagreed with the big bang. However, by the late 1990s, most astronomers had concluded that these observations did not challenge the big bang and additional data from COBE and the WMAP, provided detailed quantitative measures which were consistent with standard cosmology.

Today, heterodox non-standard cosmologies are generally considered unworthy of consideration by cosmologists while many of the historically significant nonstandard cosmologies are considered to have been falsified. The essentials of the big bang theory have been confirmed by a wide range of complementary and detailed observations, and no non-standard cosmologies have reproduced the range of successes of the big bang model. Speculations about alternatives are not normally part of research or pedagogical discussions, except as object lessons or for their historical importance. An open letter started by some remaining advocates of non-standard cosmology has affirmed that: "today, virtually all financial and experimental resources in cosmology are devoted to big bang studies...."

In the 1990s, a dawning of a "golden age of cosmology" was accompanied by a startling discovery that the expansion of the universe was, in fact, accelerating. Previous to this, it had been assumed that matter either in its visible or invisible dark matter form was the dominant energy density in the universe. This "classical" big bang cosmology was overthrown when it was discovered that nearly 70% of the energy in the universe was attributable to the cosmological constant, often referred to as "dark energy". This has led to the development of a so-called concordance ΛCDM model which combines detailed data obtained with new telescopes and techniques in observational astrophysics with an expanding, density-changing universe. Today, it is more common to find in the scientific literature proposals for "non-standard cosmologies" that actually accept the basic tenets of the big bang cosmology, while modifying parts of the concordance model. Such theories include alternative models of dark energy, such as quintessence, phantom energy and some ideas in brane cosmology; alternative models of dark matter, such as modified Newtonian dynamics; alternatives or extensions to inflation such as chaotic inflation and the ekpyrotic model; and proposals to supplement the universe with a first cause, such as the Hartle–Hawking boundary condition, the cyclic model, and the string landscape. There is no consensus about these ideas amongst cosmologists, but they are nonetheless active fields of academic inquiry.

Alternatives to Big Bang cosmologies 
Before observational evidence was gathered, theorists developed frameworks based on what they understood to be the most general features of physics and philosophical assumptions about the universe. When Albert Einstein developed his general theory of relativity in 1915, this was used as a mathematical starting point for most cosmological theories. In order to arrive at a cosmological model, however, theoreticians needed to make assumptions about the nature of the largest scales of the universe. The assumptions that the current standard model of cosmology relies upon are:

 the universality of physical laws – that the laws of physics don't change from one place and time to another,
 the cosmological principle – that the universe is roughly homogeneous and isotropic in space though not necessarily in time, and
 the Copernican principle – that we are not observing the universe from a preferred locale.

These assumptions when combined with General Relativity result in a universe that is governed by the Friedmann–Robertson–Walker metric (FRW metric). The FRW metric allows for a universe that is either expanding or contracting (as well as stationary but unstable universes). When Hubble's Law was discovered, most astronomers interpreted the law as a sign the universe is expanding. This implies the universe was smaller in the past, and therefore led to the following conclusions:

 the universe emerged from a hot, dense state at a finite time in the past,
 because the universe heats up as it contracts and cools as it expands, in the first moments that time existed as we know it, the temperatures were high enough for Big Bang nucleosynthesis to occur, and
 a cosmic microwave background pervading the entire universe should exist, which is a record of a phase transition that occurred when the atoms of the universe first formed.

These features were derived by numerous individuals over a period of years; indeed it was not until the middle of the twentieth century that accurate predictions of the last feature and observations confirming its existence were made. Non-standard theories developed either by starting from different assumptions or by contradicting the features predicted by the prevailing standard model of cosmology.

Steady State theories

The Steady State theory extends the homogeneity assumption of the cosmological principle to reflect a homogeneity in time as well as in space. This "perfect cosmological principle" as it would come to be called asserted that the universe looks the same everywhere (on the large scale), the same as it always has and always will. This is in contrast to Lambda-CDM, in which the universe looked very different in the past and will look very different in the future. Steady State theory was proposed in 1948 by Fred Hoyle, Thomas Gold, Hermann Bondi and others. In order to maintain the perfect cosmological principle in an expanding universe, steady state cosmology had to posit a "matter-creation field" (the so-called C-field) that would insert matter into the universe in order to maintain a constant density.

The debate between the Big Bang and the Steady State models would happen for 15 years with camps roughly evenly divided until the discovery of the cosmic microwave background radiation. This radiation is a natural feature of the Big Bang model which demands a "time of last scattering" where photons decouple with baryonic matter. The Steady State model proposed that this radiation could be accounted for by so-called "integrated starlight" which was a background caused in part by Olbers' paradox in an infinite universe. In order to account for the uniformity of the background, steady state proponents posited a fog effect associated with microscopic iron particles that would scatter radio waves in such a manner as to produce an isotropic CMB. The proposed phenomena was whimsically named "cosmic iron whiskers" and served as the thermalization mechanism. The Steady State theory did not have the horizon problem of the Big Bang because it assumed an infinite amount of time was available for thermalizing the background.

As more cosmological data began to be collected, cosmologists began to realize that the Big Bang correctly predicted the abundance of light elements observed in the cosmos. What was a coincidental ratio of hydrogen to deuterium and helium in the steady state model was a feature of the Big Bang model. Additionally, detailed measurements of the CMB since the 1990s with the COBE, WMAP and Planck observations indicated that the spectrum of the background was closer to a blackbody than any other source in nature. The best integrated starlight models could predict was a thermalization to the level of 10% while the COBE satellite measured the deviation at one part in 105. After this dramatic discovery, the majority of cosmologists became convinced that the steady state theory could not explain the observed CMB properties.

Although the original steady state model is now considered to be contrary to observations (particularly the CMB) even by its one-time supporters, modifications of the steady state model have been proposed, including a model that envisions the universe as originating through many little bangs rather than one big bang (the so-called "quasi-steady state cosmology"). It supposes that the universe goes through periodic expansion and contraction phases, with a soft "rebound" in place of the Big Bang. Thus the Hubble Law is explained by the fact that the universe is currently in an expansion phase. Work continues on this model (most notably by Jayant V. Narlikar), although it has not gained widespread mainstream acceptance.

Proposals based on observational skepticism
As the observational cosmology began to develop, certain astronomers began to offer alternative speculations regarding the interpretation of various phenomena that occasionally became parts of non-standard cosmologies.

Tired light

Tired light theories challenge the common interpretation of Hubble's Law as a sign the universe is expanding. It was proposed by Fritz Zwicky in 1929. The basic proposal amounted to light losing energy ("getting tired") due to the distance it traveled rather than any metric expansion or physical recession of sources from observers. A traditional explanation of this effect was to attribute a dynamical friction to photons; the photons' gravitational interactions with stars and other material will progressively reduce their momentum, thus producing a redshift. Other proposals for explaining how photons could lose energy included the scattering of light by intervening material in a process similar to observed interstellar reddening. However, all these processes would also tend to blur images of distant objects, and no such blurring has been detected.

Traditional tired light has been found incompatible with the observed time dilation that is associated with the cosmological redshift. This idea is mostly remembered as a falsified alternative explanation for Hubble's law in most astronomy or cosmology discussions.

Redshift periodicity and intrinsic redshifts

Some astrophysicists were unconvinced that the cosmological redshifts are caused by universal cosmological expansion. Skepticism and alternative explanations began appearing in the scientific literature in the 1960s. In particular, Geoffrey Burbidge, William Tifft and Halton Arp were all observational astrophysicists who proposed that there were inconsistencies in the redshift observations of galaxies and quasars. The first two were famous for suggesting that there were periodicities in the redshift distributions of galaxies and quasars. Subsequent statistical analyses of redshift surveys, however, have not confirmed the existence of these periodicities.

During the quasar controversies of the 1970s, these same astronomers were also of the opinion that quasars exhibited high redshifts not due to their incredible distance but rather due to unexplained intrinsic redshift mechanisms that would cause the periodicities and cast doubt on the Big Bang. Arguments over how distant quasars were took the form of debates surrounding quasar energy production mechanisms, their light curves, and whether quasars exhibited any proper motion. Astronomers who believed quasars were not at cosmological distances argued that the Eddington luminosity set limits on how distant the quasars could be since the energy output required to explain the apparent brightness of cosmologically distant quasars was far too high to be explainable by nuclear fusion alone. This objection was made moot by the improved models of gravity-powered accretion disks which for sufficiently dense material (such as black holes) can be more efficient at energy production than nuclear reactions. The controversy was laid to rest by the 1990s when evidence became available that observed quasars were actually the ultra-luminous cores of distant active galactic nuclei and that the major components of their redshift were in fact due to the Hubble flow.

Throughout his career, Halton Arp maintained that there were anomalies in his observations of quasars and galaxies, and that those anomalies served as a refutation of the Big Bang. In particular, Arp pointed out examples of quasars that were close to the line of sight of (relatively) nearby active, mainly Seyfert galaxies. These objects are now classified under the term active galactic nuclei (AGN). Arp criticized using such term on the ground that it isn't empirical. He claimed that clusters of quasars were in alignment around cores of these galaxies and that quasars, rather than being the cores of distant AGN, were actually much closer and were starlike-objects ejected from the centers of nearby galaxies with high intrinsic redshifts. Arp also contended that they gradually lost their non-cosmological redshift component and eventually evolved into full-fledged galaxies. This stands in stark contradiction to the accepted models of galaxy formation.

The biggest problem with Arp's analysis is that today there are hundreds of thousands of quasars with known redshifts discovered by various sky surveys. The vast majority of these quasars are not correlated in any way with nearby AGN. Indeed, with improved observing techniques, a number of host galaxies have been observed around quasars which indicates that those quasars at least really are at cosmological distances and are not the kind of objects Arp proposes. Arp's analysis, according to most scientists, suffers from being based on small number statistics and hunting for peculiar coincidences and odd associations. Unbiased samples of sources, taken from numerous galaxy surveys of the sky show none of the proposed 'irregularities', nor that any statistically significant correlations exist.

In addition, it is not clear what mechanism would be responsible for intrinsic redshifts or their gradual dissipation over time. It is also unclear how nearby quasars would explain some features in the spectrum of quasars which the standard model easily explains. In the standard cosmology, clouds of neutral hydrogen between the quasar and the earth create Lyman alpha absorption lines having different redshifts up to that of the quasar itself; this feature is called the Lyman-alpha forest.  Moreover, in extreme quasars one can observe the absorption of neutral hydrogen which has not yet been reionized in a feature known as the Gunn–Peterson trough. Most cosmologists see this missing theoretical work as sufficient reason to explain the observations as either chance or error.

Halton Arp has proposed an explanation for his observations by a Machian "variable mass hypothesis". The variable-mass theory invokes constant matter creation from active galactic nuclei, which puts it into the class of steady-state theories. With the passing of Halton Arp, this cosmology has been relegated to a dismissed theory.

Plasma cosmology

In 1965, Hannes Alfvén proposed a "plasma cosmology" theory of the universe based in part on scaling observations of space plasma physics and experiments on plasmas in terrestrial laboratories to cosmological scales orders of magnitude greater. Taking matter–antimatter symmetry as a starting point, Alfvén together with Oskar Klein proposed the Alfvén-Klein cosmology model, based on the fact that since most of the local universe was composed of matter and not antimatter there may be large bubbles of matter and antimatter that would globally balance to equality. The difficulties with this model were apparent almost immediately. Matter–antimatter annihilation results in the production of high energy photons which were not observed. While it was possible that the local "matter-dominated" cell was simply larger than the observable universe, this proposition did not lend itself to observational tests.

Like the steady state theory, plasma cosmology includes a Strong Cosmological Principle which assumes that the universe is isotropic in time as well as in space. Matter is explicitly assumed to have always existed, or at least that it formed at a time so far in the past as to be forever beyond humanity's empirical methods of investigation.

While plasma cosmology has never had the support of most astronomers or physicists, a small number of plasma researchers have continued to promote and develop the approach, and publish in the special issues of the IEEE Transactions on Plasma Science. A few papers regarding plasma cosmology were published in other mainstream journals until the 1990s. Additionally, in 1991, Eric J. Lerner, an independent researcher in plasma physics and nuclear fusion, wrote a popular-level book supporting plasma cosmology called The Big Bang Never Happened. At that time there was renewed interest in the subject among the cosmological community along with other non-standard cosmologies. This was due to anomalous results reported in 1987 by Andrew Lange and Paul Richardson of UC Berkeley and Toshio Matsumoto of Nagoya University that indicated the cosmic microwave background might not have a blackbody spectrum. However, the final announcement (in April 1992) of COBE satellite data corrected the earlier contradiction of the Big Bang; the popularity of plasma cosmology has since fallen.

Alternatives and extensions to Lambda-CDM 
The standard model of cosmology today, the Lambda-CDM model, has been extremely successful at providing a theoretical framework for structure formation, the anisotropies in the cosmic microwave background, and the accelerating expansion of the universe. However, it is not without its problems. There are many proposals today that challenge various aspects of the Lambda-CDM model. These proposals typically modify some of the main features of Lambda-CDM, but do not reject the Big Bang.

Anisotropic universe

Isotropicity – the idea that the universe looks the same in all directions – is one of the core assumptions that enters into the Friedmann equations. In 2008 however, scientists working on Wilkinson Microwave Anisotropy Probe data claimed to have detected a 600–1000 km/s flow of clusters toward a 20-degree patch of sky between the constellations of Centaurus and Vela. They suggested that the motion may be a remnant of the influence of no-longer-visible regions of the universe prior to inflation. The detection is controversial, and other scientists have found that the universe is isotropic to a great degree.

Exotic dark matter 

In Lambda-CDM, dark matter is an extremely inert form of matter that does not interact with both ordinary matter (baryons) and light, but still exerts gravitational effects. To produce the large-scale structure we see today, dark matter is "cold" (the 'C' in Lambda-CDM), i.e. non-relativistic. Dark matter has not been conclusively identified, and its exact nature is the subject of intense study. The leading dark matter candidates are weakly interacting massive particles (WIMPs) and axions. Both of these are new elementary particles not included in the Standard Model of Particle Physics. A major difference between the two is their mass: WIMPs generally have masses in the GeV range, while axions are much lighter, with masses in the meV range or lower.

WIMPs and axions are far from the only dark matter candidates, and there are a variety of other proposals, e.g.:

Self-interacting dark matter, wherein dark matter particles interact with themselves.
Warm dark matter, which are more relativistic than cold dark matter, but less relativistic than the observationally-excluded hot dark matter.
Fuzzy cold dark matter, which have particles much lighter than axions – in the 10−22 eV range.

Yet other theories attempt to explain dark matter and dark energy as different facets of the same underlying fluid (see dark fluid), or hypothesize that dark matter could decay into dark energy.

Exotic dark energy

In Lambda-CDM, dark energy is an unknown form of energy that tends to accelerate the expansion of the universe. It is less well-understood than dark matter, and similarly mysterious. The simplest explanation of dark energy is the cosmological constant (the 'Lambda' in Lambda-CDM). This is a simple constant added to the Einstein field equations to provide a repulsive force. Thus far observations are fully consistent with the cosmological constant, but leave room for a plethora of alternatives, e.g.:

Quintessence, which is a scalar field similar to the one that drove cosmic inflation shortly after the Big Bang. In quintessence, dark energy will usually vary over time (as opposed to the cosmological constant, which remains a constant).
Inhomogeneous cosmology. One of the fundamental assumptions of Lambda-CDM is that the universe is homogeneous – that is, it looks broadly the same regardless of where the observer is. In the inhomogeneous universe scenario, the observed dark energy is a measurement artefact caused by us being located at an emptier-than-average region of space.
Variable dark energy, which is similar to quintessence in that the properties of dark energy vary over time (see figure), but different in that dark energy is not due to a scalar field.

Alternatives to General Relativity 

General relativity, upon which the FRW metric is based, is an extremely successful theory which has met every observational test so far. However, at a fundamental level it is incompatible with quantum mechanics, and by predicting singularities, it also predicts its own breakdown. Any alternative theory of gravity would imply immediately an alternative cosmological theory since current modeling is dependent on general relativity as a framework assumption. There are many different motivations to modify general relativity, such as to eliminate the need for dark matter or dark energy, or to avoid such paradoxes as the firewall.

Machian universe 

Ernst Mach developed a kind of extension to general relativity which proposed that inertia was due to gravitational effects of the mass distribution of the universe. This led naturally to speculation about the cosmological implications for such a proposal. Carl Brans and Robert Dicke were able to successfully incorporate Mach's principle into general relativity which admitted for cosmological solutions that would imply a variable mass. The homogeneously distributed mass of the universe would result in a roughly scalar field that permeated the universe and would serve as a source for Newton's gravitational constant; creating a theory of quantum gravity.

MOND 

Modified Newtonian Dynamics (MOND) is a relatively modern proposal to explain the galaxy rotation problem based on a variation of Newton's Second Law of Dynamics at low accelerations. This would produce a large-scale variation of Newton's universal theory of gravity. A modification of Newton's theory would also imply a modification of general relativistic cosmology in as much as Newtonian cosmology is the limit of Friedman cosmology. While almost all astrophysicists today reject MOND in favor of dark matter, a small number of researchers continue to enhance it, recently incorporating Brans–Dicke theories into treatments that attempt to account for cosmological observations.

Tensor–vector–scalar gravity (TeVeS) is a proposed relativistic theory that is equivalent to Modified Newtonian dynamics (MOND) in the non-relativistic limit, which purports to explain the galaxy rotation problem without invoking dark matter. Originated by Jacob Bekenstein in 2004, it incorporates various dynamical and non-dynamical tensor fields, vector fields and scalar fields.

The break-through of TeVeS over MOND is that it can explain the phenomenon of gravitational lensing, a cosmic optical illusion in which matter bends light, which has been confirmed many times. A recent preliminary finding is that it can explain structure formation without CDM, but requiring a ~2eV massive neutrino (they are also required to fit some Clusters of galaxies, including the Bullet Cluster). However, other authors (see Slosar, Melchiorri and Silk) argue that TeVeS can't explain cosmic microwave background anisotropies and structure formation at the same time, i.e. ruling out those models at high significance.

f(R) gravity 

f(R) gravity is a family of theories that modify general relativity by defining a different function of the Ricci scalar. The simplest case is just the function being equal to the scalar; this is general relativity. As a consequence of introducing an arbitrary function, there may be freedom to explain the accelerated expansion and structure formation of the Universe without adding unknown forms of dark energy or dark matter. Some functional forms may be inspired by corrections arising from a quantum theory of gravity. f(R) gravity was first proposed in 1970 by Hans Adolph Buchdahl (although φ was used rather than f for the name of the arbitrary function). It has become an active field of research following work by Starobinsky on cosmic inflation. A wide range of phenomena can be produced from this theory by adopting different functions; however, many functional forms can now be ruled out on observational grounds, or because of pathological theoretical problems.

See also
Quantum cosmology

Notes

Bibliography 
 Arp, Halton, Seeing Red. Apeiron, Montreal. 1998. 
 Hannes, Alfvén D., Cosmic Plasma. Reidel Pub Co., 1981. 
 Hoyle, Fred; Geoffrey Burbidge, and Jayant V. Narlikar, A Different Approach to Cosmology: From a Static Universe through the Big Bang towards Reality. Cambridge University Press. 2000. 
 Lerner, Eric J., Big Bang Never Happened, Vintage Books, 1992. 
 Narlikar, Jayant Vishnu, Introduction to Cosmology. Jones & Bartlett Pub.

External links and references
 Narlikar, Jayant V. and T. Padmanabhan, "Standard Cosmology and Alternatives: A Critical Appraisal". Annual Review of Astronomy and Astrophysics, Vol. 39, pp. 211–248 (2001).
 Wright, Edward L. "Cosmological Fads and Fallacies:" Errors in some popular attacks on the Big Bang

Physical cosmology
Fringe physics
Astronomical controversies
Big Bang